Trachyarus is a genus of parasitoid wasps belonging to the family Ichneumonidae.

The species of this genus are found in Europe.

Species:
 Trachyarus anceps (Berthoumieu, 1906) 
 Trachyarus bacillatus Gokhman, 2007

References

Ichneumonidae
Ichneumonidae genera